William Rawsel Bradford (October 25, 1933 - January 24, 2019) was a general authority of the Church of Jesus Christ of Latter-day Saints (LDS Church) from 1975 until his death.

Bradford was born in Springville, Utah, to Rawsel W. Bradford and Mary Waddoups.  During the 1940s Bradford went to Hawaii as his parents served as missionaries in the Laie Hawaii Temple Visitors Center. He graduated from Springville High School and then began studies at Brigham Young University. From 1953 to 1955, Bradford was a missionary for the LDS Church in Japan. He then married Mary Ann Bird, a native of Mapleton, Utah, in the Salt Lake Temple.

Bradford then served in the United States military. After this he moved to McAllen, Texas, and began a fruit-growing operation called International Fruit Growers and Shippers, Inc. The company's operations extended into Mexico and Central America. Bradford was heavily involved in LDS Church outreach to Mexican Americans in the McAllen area. In the McAllen area, he served as branch president, a counselor in the district presidency, and as district mission president.

Bradford later served as a mission president in Santiago, Chile. Craig C. Christensen, who would also later become a general authority, was among the missionaries who served under his direction. In 1975, he became a general authority as a member of the First Quorum of the Seventy. He was a member of this quorum until 2003, when he was designated as an emeritus general authority.

Bradford and his wife are the parents of six children. Their daughter Marcia married Brent H. Nielson, who later became a general authority. From 2006 to 2009, Bradford served as president of the Houston Texas Temple.

Bradford died on January 24, 2019.

References

"Elder William R. Bradford of the First Quorum of the Seventy", Ensign, November 1975
"New temple presidents", Church News July 1, 2006

External links
Grandpa Bill's GA Pages: William R. Bradford

1933 births
2019 deaths
American general authorities (LDS Church)
People from Springville, Utah
Brigham Young University alumni
Mission presidents (LDS Church)
Members of the First Quorum of the Seventy (LDS Church)
Temple presidents and matrons (LDS Church)
American Mormon missionaries in Japan
American Mormon missionaries in Chile
20th-century Mormon missionaries
People from McAllen, Texas
Latter Day Saints from Texas
Latter Day Saints from Hawaii
Latter Day Saints from Utah